1971 Surgut Aeroflot Antonov An-12 crash may refer to either one of the two similar accidents that happened within 9 days of each other:
 1971 January 22 Surgut Aeroflot Antonov An-12 crash
 1971 January 31 Surgut Aeroflot Antonov An-12 crash